Return to the Beloved is a 1979 French drama film directed by Jean-François Adam. Starring Isabelle Huppert, Jacques Dutronc and Bruno Ganz, it tells the story of a man who tries to win back his ex-wife by framing her new husband for murder.

Plot
Julien, a well-known concert pianist until his divorce, has become obsessed with regaining his ex-wife Jeanne and their little son Thomas. Living in his family home outside Paris that he left to her, she has married a German doctor named Stephan and broken off all contact with him. He blackmails a private detective named Keller to murder the husband but, as the man approaches the house at night, Julien instead shoots him dead with Stephan's revolver that he had stolen earlier. He had also scattered other clues to incriminate the doctor. The body is found by young Thomas, upon which Jeanne sends an urgent message to Julien asking him to come and support her with their traumatised child. Already dismayed over an unexplained body in the grounds, Stephan now has to put up with the proprietorial airs of Julien. The police, initially mystified over this tense ménage à trois, come up with an ingenious solution. They ostensibly arrest Stephan, in fact hiding him in a comfortable hotel, and keep a watch on the remaining two suspects. Jeanne works out Julien's plot, which he does not deny when confronted, saying he only did it so that they could be together again. At this point the police drive up to the house and release Stephan.

Cast
 Isabelle Huppert - Jeanne Kern
 Jacques Dutronc - Julien
 Bruno Ganz - Dr. Stephan Kern
 Christian Rist - Keller
 Jean-François Adam - Police Inspector Corbin
 Rodolphe Schacher - Thomas

See also
 Isabelle Huppert on screen and stage

References

External links

1979 films
French drama films
1970s French-language films
1979 drama films
Films directed by Jean-François Adam
Films with screenplays by Jean-Claude Carrière
1970s French films